Vijay Kumar Singh, also known as Dabloo Singh is an Indian politician and a member of Bihar Legislative Assembly of India. He was elected in 2020 Bihar Legislative Assembly election as a member of Rashtriya Janata Dal from Nabinagar.

References

Indian politicians
Year of birth missing (living people)
Living people